Jermaine Manuel Palacios Leon (born July 19, 1996) is a Venezuelan professional baseball infielder in the Detroit Tigers organization. He made his Major League Baseball (MLB) debut in 2022 with the Minnesota Twins.

Career

Minnesota Twins
Palacios signed as an international free agent with the Minnesota Twins organization in 2014 and made his debut that same year, for the DSL Twins, where he spent the whole season, posting a .270 batting average with 29 RBIs and 14 stolen bases in 49 games. In 2015, he played for both the GCL Twins and the Elizabethton Twins, posting a combined .370 batting average with three home runs and 37 RBIs in 57 total games between both teams. He spent 2016 with the Cedar Rapids Kernals where he batted .222 with one home run and 28 RBIs in 71 games. He began the 2017 season back with Cedar Rapids, and after batting .320 with 11 home runs and 39 RBIs in 62 games, was promoted to the Fort Myers Miracle where he finished the season with a .269 batting average with two home runs and 28 RBIs in another 62 games.

Tampa Bay Rays
On February 18, 2018, the Twins traded Palacios to the Tampa Bay Rays for Jake Odorizzi. He began 2018 with the Montgomery Biscuits but was reassigned to the Charlotte Stone Crabs during the season. In 118 total games between the two teams, he hit .217 with two home runs and 53 RBIs. He began 2019 with Montgomery.

Minnesota Twins (second stint)
The Rays released Palacios and he signed a minor league contract with the Twins. He began the 2022 season with the St. Paul Saints. The Twins promoted him to the major leagues on May 31, 2022, and he made his major league debut that day. The Twins returned him to St. Paul on June 8, and promoted him back to the major leagues on September 3.

Detroit Tigers
Palacios was claimed off waivers by the Detroit Tigers on October 12, 2022. He elected free agency on November 10, 2022. He resigned a minor league deal on November 29, 2022.

References

External links

Living people
1996 births
Major League Baseball players from Venezuela
Major League Baseball shortstops
Minnesota Twins players
Dominican Summer League Twins players
Gulf Coast Twins players
Elizabethton Twins players
Cedar Rapids Kernels players
Fort Myers Miracle players
Montgomery Biscuits players
Charlotte Stone Crabs players
Wichita Wind Surge players
St. Paul Saints players
Cardenales de Lara players